Labicymbium is a genus of South American dwarf spiders that was first described by Alfred Frank Millidge in 1991.

Species
 it contains twenty species, found in Brazil, Colombia, Ecuador, Peru, and Venezuela:
Labicymbium ambiguum Millidge, 1991 – Colombia
Labicymbium auctum Millidge, 1991 – Colombia
Labicymbium avium Millidge, 1991 – Ecuador
Labicymbium breve Millidge, 1991 – Colombia
Labicymbium cognatum Millidge, 1991 – Peru
Labicymbium cordiforme Millidge, 1991 – Colombia
Labicymbium curitiba Rodrigues, 2008 – Brazil
Labicymbium dentichele Millidge, 1991 – Peru
Labicymbium exiguum Millidge, 1991 – Colombia
Labicymbium fuscum Millidge, 1991 – Colombia
Labicymbium jucundum Millidge, 1991 – Colombia
Labicymbium majus Millidge, 1991 – Colombia
Labicymbium montanum Millidge, 1991 – Venezuela
Labicymbium nigrum Millidge, 1991 – Colombia
Labicymbium opacum Millidge, 1991 – Colombia
Labicymbium otti Rodrigues, 2008 – Brazil
Labicymbium rancho Ott & Lise, 1997 – Brazil
Labicymbium rusticulum (Keyserling, 1891) – Brazil
Labicymbium sturmi Millidge, 1991 (type) – Colombia
Labicymbium sublestum Millidge, 1991 – Colombia, Ecuador

See also
 List of Linyphiidae species (I–P)

References

Araneomorphae genera
Linyphiidae
Spiders of South America